The Secret of the American Docks (German: Das Geheimnis des Amerika-Docks) Is a 1919 German silent mystery film directed by Ewald André Dupont and starring Max Landa, Gustav Botz, and Reinhold Schünzel.

The film's sets were designed by the art director Robert A. Dietrich.

Cast
Max Landa as detective 
Gustav Botz as James Mistoll 
Reinhold Schünzel as Corbett, adventurer
Carl Grünwald as Robert Hatt, Owner of the firm Hatt & Mistoll 
Leonhard Haskel as old patch cobber 
Ria Jende as Vera 
Max Laurence as C. Dale, independent scholar
Rose Lichtenstein as Gertie Mistoll 
Albert Paul as Dr. Vaneel, alienist 
Karl Platen as Williams, factory worker
Fritz Schulz as Barnes, detective's assistant
Fritz Sterler as Clarence Mistoll 
Helene Voß as Lieschen, detective's economist 
Max Zilzer as Sparkes, accountant

References

External links

Films of the Weimar Republic
German silent feature films
Films directed by E. A. Dupont
German mystery films
1919 mystery films
German black-and-white films
Silent mystery films
1910s German films